Derin may refer to:
 Zihni Derin (1880–1965), Turkish agriculturalist
 Derin Seale, Australian filmmaker
 Derin Tanrıyaşükür (2006–), Turkish artistic gymnast
 Derin Young, Australian producer and songwriter
 Zafer Derin, Turkish archaeologist, worked on excavations at the Yeşilova Höyük site